Ishaq Olarewaju Oloyede   (born 10 October 1954) is a professor of islamic studies, an academic and public servant. He is a former Vice Chancellor of the University of Ilorin, Nigeria, and the current Registrar and Chief Executive of Nigeria's Joint Admissions and Matriculation Board, JAMB.

Education
He was born on 10 October 1954, in Abeokuta South local government area of Ogun State.
Oloyede had his Secondary Education from 1969–1973 at the Progressive Institute, Agege Lagos. He then learned Arabic and Islamic Studies between 1973–1976 at the Arabic Training Centre Agege, Lagos, (Markaz). He received a certificate in Arabic and Islamic Studies at the University of Ibadan in 1977 and a B.A. in Arabic at the University of Ilorin in 1981. In July 1982 he was appointed an Assistant Lecturer in  the Department of Religions of the University. In 1991, he had his Doctorate degree in Islamic Studies also from the University of Ilorin.

Oloyede earned several scholarships and prizes during his student days, notable among which were the Arab League prize for the best final year Certificate student in Arabic and Islamic Studies in 1977 at the University of Ibadan; Federal Government undergraduate merit award from 1979 to 1981; Department of Religions Award, University of Ilorin, 1981 and Faculty of Arts and Social Sciences Award, Unilorin also in 1981.

Memberships
Oloyede is a member of the Board of the Association of Commonwealth Universities (2010 – 2012); and also a member of many learned and professional societies;
•	Fellow of the Islamic Academy of Cambridge, United Kingdom.
•	Fellow, Academy of Entrepreneurship.
•	Member of Nigerian Association of Teachers of Arabic and Islamic Studies (NATAIS).
•	Member of Editorial Board, Centre for Islamic Legal Studies, ABU, Zaria, among several others.
•	Former National President of the Unilorin Alumni Association (1995 and 1998).

Career
Oloyede attained the rank of Professor in 1995. He was elected Vice Chancellor of his alma mater University of Ilorin in 2007 for a term of five years, during which the university became highly-ranked among the best in Africa and the most sough-after university in Nigeria.

Oloyede also served as the Chairman of the Association of Vice-Chancellors of Nigerian Universities and Committee of Vice-Chancellors between 2011–2012. At the international level, he has held several distinguished positions. Between 2009–2011, he was the president of the Association of African Universities (AAU). Other positions include: Deputy Chairman of the Governing Board of the International Association of Universities (IAU) [2008 – 2011]; and Secretary-General, Association of West African Universities (AWAU) [2013 – 2017]. In 2015, he was appointed the (2nd) Pro-Chancellor and Chairman of the 3rd Governing Council of Fountain University, Nigeria.

In 2005, he was appointed by President Olusegun Obasanjo as Co-Secretary of the National Political Reform Conference. In 2006, he was appointment as consultant by the National Universities Commission on Educational Reforms in Nigeria. Oloyede became the National Coordinator and Executive Secretary of the National Inter–Religious Council (NIREC) in 2007. Since 2013, he has been the Secretary-General of the Nigerian Supreme Council for Islamic Affairs (NSCIA).

In 2016, President Muhammadu Buhari appointed him as the Registrar of the Joint Admission and Matriculation Board (JAMB), an appointment, personally described "divine" by him, that was greeted by applauds from several quarters of the Nigerian society. Since assumption of office, Oloyede has been praised for transforming JAMB into a reference point in effective public service delivery, transparency and accountability in Nigeria.

References

University of Ilorin alumni
Academic staff of the University of Ilorin
University of Ibadan alumni
1954 births
Living people